Wyatt is a given name and surname.

Wyatt may also refer to:

Places

Antarctica
 Wyatt Glacier, in southern Graham Land
 Wyatt Hill, a small ice-covered hill, Marie Byrd Land
 Wyatt Island, an island off the west coast of Graham Land

United States
 Wyatt, Indiana, an unincorporated community in St. Joseph County
 Wyatt, Missouri, a city in Mississippi County
 Wyatt, West Virginia, an unincorporated community in Harrison County
 Donald W. Wyatt Detention Facility, a privately operated federal prison in Central Falls, Rhode Island

Other uses
 Wyatt (band), a Canadian country music group
 Wyatt (novel), a 2010 crime novel by Australian novelist Garry Disher